Gardiner and Joseph (or Gardener and Joseph, or Gardner and Joseph) was launched at Hull in 1802. She made seven voyages as a whaler in the northern whale fishery until she was wrecked in November 1808.

Career
Gardner & Joseph first appeared in Lloyd's Register (LR) for 1802 with Js.Allen, master, Foggintons, owner, and trade Hull–Davis Strait. (Later LR corrected the burthen to 372 tons and the ownership to Eggingtons.)

On 4 March 1803 Lloyd's List (LL) reported that  and Gardner & Joseph had been on their way to Davis Strait when they had had to put back to Hull having lost anchors and cables, and having sustained other damage.

The following data is from Coltish, supplemented by data from LR and the Register of Shipping (RS):

Gardner & Joseph was off Whitby from Davis Strait on 8 August, and she arrived back at Hull on 10 August.

Both LR and the RS for 1809 (published in 1808), showed her master as J. Dick and that she had had damages repaired in 1806. However, LR now showed her trade as Hull–Quebec.

Fate
In November 1808 Gardiner and Joseph was driven ashore in the Saint Lawrence River. Gardner and Joseph was on a voyage from Quebec City to London.

Her owners replaced her with another ship, launched at Hull in 1810.

Citations and references
Citations

References
 

1802 ships
Age of Sail merchant ships of England
Whaling ships
Maritime incidents in 1808
Shipwrecks of Canada
Shipwrecks in rivers